David Shanahan may refer to:
 David Shanahan (politician)
 David Shanahan (rugby union)